Dr. Avshalom Kor (born 17 September 1950) is  an Israeli linguist and expert on Hebrew grammar and semantics.

He is known to provide upon request, the grammatical root of any given Hebrew word and/or name along with its Biblical origins and contextual references.

He is probably best known  as an authority on the gender of Hebrew words and the   proper usage of suffixes and plural extensions.

He has a daily show on Israel army radio (Galey Tzahal) and a weekly show on Israeli TV Channel 1.

He also made a guest appearance in Episode 14 Season 3 of Srugim.

Published books
(2004). Ṭeḳes ha-azkarah ha-mamlakhti li-Reḥavʻam Zeʼevi: 4 be-Ḥeshṿan 765, 19.10.04 Har Hertsl. Yerushalayim, Maṭeh ha-hasbarah.
(1994) הגיע זמן לשון : מבחר תכניות מסדרת הטלויזיה ערוץ 1, רשות השידור (Higiʻa zeman lashon). [Ramat Gan], Kineret.
(1986) יופי של עברית (Yofi shel ʻIvrit). Tel Aviv, Sifriyat Maʻariv.
(1983). בלצון רב  (Be-latson rav). Tel Aviv, Sifriyat Maʻariv.
קור קורא במדבר  1981). (Ḳor ḳore ba-midbar). Tel Aviv, Sifriyat Maʻariv.
(1980).לצונו של אדם־כבודו   (Letsono shel adam-kevodo). Tel Aviv, Sifriyat Maʻariv.

References 

Linguists from Israel
Israeli Hebraists
Living people
1950 births
Tel Aviv University alumni